Grand Duke Vladimir of Russia may refer to:

The ruler of the Grand Duchy of Vladimir
Grand Duke Vladimir Alexandrovich of Russia (1847–1909), son of Emperor Alexander II of Russia
Vladimir Kirillovich, Grand Duke of Russia (1917–1992), his grandson